Daniel Cornelius Francois Human (born 3 April 1976) is a South African former rugby union footballer who last played for Toulouse in the Top 14 competition. He played as a prop. He has four caps for the Springboks.

Whilst at Toulouse he won the Heineken Cup twice in 2005 and 2010, both times featuring as a replacement.

References

External links
Toulouse profile

1976 births
Living people
South African rugby union players
South Africa international rugby union players
Stade Toulousain players
Rugby union props
Expatriate rugby union players in France
South African expatriate rugby union players
South African expatriate sportspeople in France
Rugby union players from Bloemfontein